William Smithers (born July 10, 1927) is an American actor, perhaps best known for his recurring role as Jeremy Wendell in the television series Dallas. He appeared in the series in 1981 and from 1984 to 1989.

Early life and career
Smithers was born on July 10, 1927, in Richmond, Virginia, the son of systems engineer Marion Wilkinson Smithers and Marion Albany Smithers (née Thompson). He attended Hampden-Sydney College in Virginia and Catholic University in Washington, D.C. After his freshman year, he was chosen to play the leading role of Thomas Jefferson in the first production of Paul Green's The Common Glory, presented at Williamsburg, Virginia. NY Times critic Brooks Atkinson called him "worth encouraging." 

In 1951, he made his Broadway debut as Tybalt in the Dwight Deere Wiman production of Romeo and Juliet, starring Olivia de Havilland; for this performance he received a Theater World Award. In 1952, he was accepted as a life member of The Actors Studio. In 1957, he received an Obie Award for his portrayal of Treplev in Anton Chekhov's The Seagull.

Stage
His other Broadway plays included Anouilh's Legend of Lovers, Calder Willingham's End as a Man, (begun as a project at the Actors Studio), Carson McCullers's The Square Root of Wonderful and Terence Rattigan's Man and Boy (performed in London and New York). Off-Broadway, he played leading roles in Frank Gilroy's Who'll Save the Plowboy? (Obie Award, Best Drama), Willingham's End as a Man (before the production went to Broadway), Sean O'Casey's Shadow of a Gunman (also begun as a Studio project) and George Bellak's The Troublemakers.

Film and television
In 1965, Smithers moved to Los Angeles to play David Schuster in the television series Peyton Place for nine months. He also played Stanley Norris on the soap Guiding Light from 1970–71, and from 1976–77 was a cast member in the series Executive Suite.

He has guest-starred or appeared in nearly 400 television productions, including The Invaders, Barnaby Jones in the episode titled "Theater of Fear" alongside Anne Francis (09/26/1975), Voyage To The Bottom Of The Sea, Star Trek (as "Captain Merrick" in the episode "Bread and Circuses"), Combat, Mission: Impossible, and Hawaii Five-O, as well as feature films such as Attack (1956), Trouble Man (1972), Scorpio (1973), Papillon (1973), The Six Million Dollar Man (1974),  and Deathsport (1978). His performance in Papillon prompted the producers of Demolition Man to name that film's prison warden "William Smithers".

In 1981 and from 1984–1989, he played oil baron Jeremy Wendell on the prime-time soap opera Dallas.

Smithers vs. MGM 
As the plaintiff in Smithers vs. MGM, despite being threatened with blacklisting should he pursue the matter, he sued the multimillion-dollar corporation to protect his contractual rights with regard to star billing in the 1976 television series Executive Suite. In so doing, he won a case that was appealed as far as the California Supreme Court, and is now taught in entertainment law courses.

Later life
 
He now lives in Santa Barbara, California, with his wife, acting teacher Lorrie Hull Smithers (author of Strasberg's Method: As Taught by Lorrie Hull, and with him as co-producer of the acting-training DVD The Method). From 2003–2005, he created, produced and directed the Santa Barbara Theatre of the Air for KCSB radio, broadcasting works of classic and contemporary playwrights.

From 2010 to 2013, the couple were co-hosts and co-producers of the Santa Barbara Channels (now TV Santa Barbara) television interview program "Just Between Us!" Seven episodes of this program were named finalists for the 2011, 2012 and 2013 WAVE (Western Access Video Excellence) Awards – the most nominations of the kind for a similar period in that station's history. Several dozen of the program's episodes are available on Vimeo.

In 2010 and 2011, Smithers served on the Board of Directors of TV Santa Barbara. In December 2015, he was appointed by the Santa Barbara City Council to the city's Arts Advisory Committee.

Authorship
 
In 2018-2019, he authored and published the e-book The Wizard of Sacramento: Governor Jerry Brown,  "an independent assessment of the nature, priorities, politics and governmental methods of Jerry Brown as California governor.".

Filmography

References

Demetria Fulton; previewed William Smithers in Barnaby Jones in episode titled “Theater of Fear” (09/26/1975).

External links
 
 
 

1927 births
Living people
American male film actors
American male stage actors
American male television actors
Male actors from Richmond, Virginia
Hampden–Sydney College alumni
Catholic University of America alumni